These are the late night schedules for the four United States broadcast networks that offer programming during this time period, from September 1990 to August 1991. All times are Eastern or Pacific. Affiliates will fill non-network schedule with local, syndicated, or paid programming. Affiliates also have the option to preempt or delay network programming at their discretion.

Legend

Schedule

Monday-Friday

Saturday

Sunday

By network

ABC

Returning series
Into the Night Starring Rick Dees
Nightline 

New series
In Concert '91

CBS

Returning series
CBS Late Night
CBS News Nightwatch

New series
America Tonight

Not returning from 1989-90:
The Pat Sajak Show

NBC

Returning series
Friday Night Videos
The George Michael Sports Machine
Late Night with David Letterman
Later With Bob Costas
Saturday Night Live
The Tonight Show Starring Johnny Carson

Fox

Returning series
Comic Strip Late Night

United States late night network television schedules
1990 in American television
1991 in American television